Totché (sometimes also toetché) is a traditional cake from the Canton of Jura, in Switzerland. The cake is made of leavened dough and covered with sour cream-based mix. While this can be eaten all year round, it is particularly popular around local festivities such as St. Martin's Day.

References

Culinary Heritage of Switzerland
Canton of Jura